Daniela Viaggiamari, known professionally by her stage name Dani La Chepi (born in Boulogne, Buenos Aires) is an Argentine television presenter, actress, singer, comedian and social media influencer.

Career 
Dani La Chepi is of Italian descent. She began her career when she was sixteen years old. During her studies, she had the opportunity to act in a scene of the program, Feliz Domingo. She worked in television between 1997 and 1998 after joining the cast of the youth program, Los Más Más. She later participated in several soap operas, such as EnAmorArte, Floricienta, Rincón de luz, My love, Married with children, Almost Angels, Pirate Soul and I Will Survive. She also worked on radio, participating in El Mundo, Pop and Los 40 Principales, where she worked with Iván de Pineda. She appeared on Radio Belgrano, Pop Radio and Radio El Mundo, and was a contestant on the second season of MasterChef Celebrity Argentina.

In cinema, she has worked in supporting roles in the films La Boleta (2013), directed by Andrés Paternostro, starring Damián de Santo, Marcelo Mazzarello, Claudio Rissi and Roly Serrano and in Ten Less (2018), directed by Roberto Salomone, together with Diego Pérez and Daniel Alvaredo.

She sang alongside Cacho Castaña at the Café, La Humedad. In 2020, she released a song What are you going to do in collaboration with Evelyn Botto. She also worked on the video Loca de mi corazón, by Manuel Wirzt.

In theatre, she performed in Dani, La Chepi de noche directed by Noralih Gago, Final battle of comedians and Ella, along with Ariel Tarico. She also hosts business and social events and runs her own tango show featuring melodic themes, appearing in places like San Clemente, Villa Gesell, San Bernardo, Miramar, and Mar del Plata.

She is author of a book titled, The important thing is to be happy (Planeta, 2018).

She is an instagrammer with more than three million subscribers and posts humorous videos and scenes with celebrities, such as Pablo Granados, "El Tucu" López, Rodrigo Guirao Díaz and Mariano Martínez. She was the winner of a Martín Fierro Digital Award for the best instagrammer.

Private life 
From 2020, she was in a relationship with Javier Cordone, a trucker and ex-soccer player whom she met while making one of her videos with her daughter during the quarantine.

Cinema

Television

Theater 

 2018/2019: Dani, La Chepi at night
 2019: OOPS! Vol 10
 2019: Final battle of comedians
 2019/2020: She

Prizes 

 2021: Martín Fierro Digital Award for Best Humorous Work, and Martín Fierro Digital Gold Award.
 2017: Martín Fierro Digital Award for the best instagramer.

See also 

 eltrece
 El gran juego de la oca

References 

Living people
1979 births
Argentine women singers
Argentine women comedians
Argentine female dancers
Argentine dramatists and playwrights
Argentine television actresses
Argentine film actresses